General elections were held in Malta on 16 and 17 September 1900, the third in three years. Only one of the thirteen elected seats was contested.

Background
The elections were held under the Knutsford Constitution. Ten members were elected from single-member constituencies, whilst a further three members were elected to represent nobility and landowners, graduates and the Chamber of Commerce.

Results
A total of 9,301 people were registered to vote, although votes were only cast in one constituency.

References

1900
Malta
1900 in Malta
September 1900 events